The 1887 Kentucky Derby was the 13th running of the Kentucky Derby. The race took place on May 11, 1887.

Full results

Payout
The winner received a purse of $4,200.
Second place received $300.
Third place received $150.

References

1887
Kentucky Derby
May 1887 sports events
Derby